Ordnance is a ghost town in Umatilla County, Oregon, United States, southwest of Hermiston on Interstate 84/U.S. Route 30, near the intersection with Interstate 82. In 1941, the United States Department of War commissioned the establishment of Umatilla Ordnance Depot in northern Umatilla County; it was later renamed Umatilla Army Depot and then Umatilla Chemical Depot. The town was named after the depot, and Ordnance post office was established in 1943. By the 1960s, Ordnance was no longer a community.

See also
List of ghost towns in Oregon

References

External links 
 Historic photo of the Umatilla Ordnance Depot from the Oregon Historical Society
 History of the depot from the Center for Columbia River History

Former populated places in Umatilla County, Oregon
Ghost towns in Oregon
1943 establishments in Oregon